7 Gold is an Italy-based television network, Founded in 1999 by the Italian business people Giorgio Tacchino, Giorgio Galante and Luigi Ferretti, owned by some its affiliated, and operates as a broadcast network.
It airs TV series, movies, news and weather bulletins, political and sports debates programs and infomercials.

History 
It was founded on 31 May 1999 under the name Italia 7 Gold by the entrepreneurs Giorgio Tacchino, Giorgio Galante and Luigi Ferretti, respectively owners of Telecity, Telepadova and Sestarete, three broadcasters already affiliated to Italia 7 (from which Europa 7 was born), after Francesco Di Stefano, founder of Europa 7, it took part in the frequency assignment tender thus renouncing the syndication of local broadcasters which until then had broadcast the Europa 7 signal as they would have become useless.

The station is based in Assago, in the Milanese hinterland, which runs alongside the Castelletto d'Orba office in Piedmont. The network director is Giorgio Galante of Telepadova.

In 2001, when Telemontecarlo became LA7, the publisher of the network warned Telecom Italia, owner of the nascent network, from using the name with the number "7" threatening legal actions and polemically marking their broadcasts with a logo bearing the words "La Sette" together with the official one, but the story did not have any sequel. On 15 February 2001, with the match PSV-Parma, Italia 7 Gold was the first circuit of local broadcasters to broadcast a UEFA Cup Round of 16.

Initially visible only in northern Italy, it spread a few years later to almost the whole national territory, registering a growing audience which, according to the Auditel surveys, reached peaks of 1.5%, especially in the evening and at night. In the summer of 2006, Telecity took the name Italia 7 on video with a different design from that of the old circuit instead of that of 7 Gold. The various conductors, furthermore, indicate the circuit now with that name. Since September 2006, after the 7 Gold name returned during the summer with a brand similar to the one there was for Italia 7, they have been using the golden logo.

From 10 December 2010 to the end of 2012, 7 Gold programming became visible on the Hot Bird satellite thanks to 7 Gold Telecity; subsequently due to the high satellite management costs, the broadcaster renounced satellite transmissions.

The network started "my7.tv" where you can see all the Diretta Stadio videos on your smartphone. It is also possible to interact with guests in the studio via an app for electronic devices.

On 10 September 2017, 7 Gold renewed its logo and graphics and inaugurates new studios at the headquarters, located in Assago, which allowed the start of the transmission of contents in 16:9. Consequently, the "Silver Production" company was born, an equal joint venture between PRS Mediagroup and 7 Gold. Thus the Prs, as well as being the national advertising agency for 7 Gold, de facto also plays the role of publisher.

From 18 June 2018, 7 Gold Telecity is no longer visible in the Sardegna1 mux as the agreement with 7Gold has ended, thus being the only region not covered.

Programming

News, sports and debates
 Diretta Stadio
 Il Processo di Biscardi (hosted by Aldo Biscardi)
 TG7 Sport
 Motorpad
 Soldi
 Funamboli
 Titanic Italia
 Manuel
 Liguria Selection

TV Series
 Lassie (1954 TV series)
 The Hunger
 Red Shoe Diaries
 The Adventures of Brisco County, Jr.
 Ultimate Force
 The Adventures of Swiss Family Robinson
 Adventures of the Black Stallion
 The Secret World of Alex Mack
 The Enid Blyton Adventure Series
 Blue Heelers
 Bonanza

External links
Official Site
7 Gold at LyngSat Address

1999 establishments in Italy
Television networks in Italy
Italian-language television networks
Television channels and stations established in 1999